

The Cheoah Dam is a hydroelectric complex located in Graham and Swain counties, North Carolina, on the Little Tennessee River between river miles 51 and 52. The Cheoah Development consists of a dam and powerhouse, the  first of several constructed by the Tallassee Power Company (now Tapoco), a subsidiary of Aluminum Company of America (now Alcoa), in order to generate electricity to smelt aluminum in Alcoa, Tennessee.

The Cheoah project began in 1916 as a construction camp at the Narrows, where the Little Tennessee River flowed through a narrow gorge, and it was completed in 1919. A scenic highway runs the length of the reservoir.

The water inflow for Cheoah, like that of Calderwood and Chilhowee, is primarily dependent on releases from TVA's Fontana Dam, the primary flow control facility for the lower Little Tennessee River. Tapoco operated the Cheoah Development until 2012, when it was sold to Brookfield Renewable Energy Partners, forming Brookfield Smoky Mountain Hydropower.

When completed in 1919, the  dam was the world's highest overflow dam. The turbines were the largest in the world, and the 150,000-volt transmission line had the highest voltage and the longest span for a transmission line— across the river below Cheoah Dam. The dam and associated structures were listed on the National Register of Historic Places in 2004.

The dam was used as a filming location for the 1993 movie The Fugitive, starring Harrison Ford.

Gallery

See also

 National Register of Historic Places listings in Graham County, North Carolina

References

External links

 "Cheoah Dam," TVA website
  "Brookfield Renewable Energy Partners - Cheoah

Dams on the Little Tennessee River
Dams in North Carolina
Hydroelectric power plants in North Carolina
Buildings and structures in Graham County, North Carolina
Buildings and structures in Swain County, North Carolina
Alcoa Power Generating dams
Dams completed in 1919
Energy infrastructure completed in 1919
Industrial buildings and structures on the National Register of Historic Places in North Carolina
Dams on the National Register of Historic Places in North Carolina
National Register of Historic Places in Graham County, North Carolina
National Register of Historic Places in Swain County, North Carolina
Historic districts on the National Register of Historic Places in North Carolina
1919 establishments in North Carolina